Paul Fielder is an American politician from Montana. He is a Republican member of the Montana House of Representatives for district 13.

References 

Republican Party members of the Montana House of Representatives
Living people
Year of birth missing (living people)